Titivillus was a demon said to work on behalf of Belphegor, Lucifer or Satan to introduce errors into the work of scribes. Attribution has also been given to Caesarius of Heisterbach. Titivillus has also been described as collecting idle chat that occurs during church service, and mispronounced, mumbled or skipped words of the service, to take to Hell to be counted against the offenders.[Source?]

He has been called the "patron demon of scribes", as Titivillus provides an easy excuse for the errors that are bound to creep into manuscripts as they are copied.

Marc Drogin noted in his instructional manual, Medieval Calligraphy: Its History and Technique (1980), that "for the past half-century every edition of The Oxford English Dictionary has listed an incorrect page reference for, of all things, a footnote on the earliest mention of Titivillus."

Titivillus gained a broader role as a subversive figure of physical comedy, with satirical commentary on human vanities, in late medieval English pageants, such as the  that finishes the Towneley Cycle. He plays an antagonistic role in the Medieval English play Mankind.

In an anonymous fifteenth-century English devotional treatise, Titivillus introduced himself thus (I.xx.54): ""

Origin of the name

I have heard that a certain holy man, while in the choir, saw a devil truly weighed down with a full sack. When, however, he commanded the demon to tell what he carried, the evil one said: "These are the syllables and syncopated words and verses of the psalms which these very clerics in their morning prayers stole from God; you can be sure I am keeping these diligently for their accusation."A slightly different translation is given in The Exempla of Illustrative Stories from the Sermones Vulgares of Jacques de Vitry, ed. and trans. by T. S. Crane (New York: B. Franklin, 1971), p. 141.

This demon was later given the name "Titivillus" by Johannes Galensis c. 1285. "Titivillus collects fragments of words and puts them in his bag thousand times every day." (Fragmina verborum Titivillus colligit horum quibus die mille vicibus se sarcinat ille).

Regarding the demon's function, André Vernet points out that the Latin terms, particularly "collect" and "fragments" for the clery's omissions, derive from John 6:12, the Feeding the multitude narrative, in which the disciples are told to "Gather up the broken pieces." As to the demon's name, Titivillus, Vernet points to The City of God (Book IV, Chapter 8), in a passage in which Augustine, while giving examples of the numerous Roman deities assigned to each step of the agricultural process, mentions a goddess Tutilina whose job is to watch over grain after it was collected and stored. However, we must imagine a series of copyists' errors (perhaps in the copy of City of God available to Johannes Galensis) to arrive at "Titivillus" and its many variants: Tutivillus, Tytivillum, Tintillus, Tantillus, Tintinillus, Titivitilarius, Titivilitarius.

In popular culture
Since 1977, one of the many devils populating the role-playing game Dungeons and Dragons is named "Titivilus."

He was the subject of the book Tittivulus or The Verbiage Collector by Michael Ayrton (Max Reinhardt: London, 1953).[Cite your sources man!]

See also 
Printer's devil

Notes

References

Further reading 

Drogin, Marc, Medieval Calligraphy: Its History and Technique, Dover Publications, 1980. 
Who is Titivillus?
Montañés, J. G, Tutivillus. El demonio de las erratas, Madrid, Turpin, 2015.
Montañés, J. G, Titivillus. Il demone dei refusi, Perugia, Graphe.it, 2018

Demons in Christianity
Scribes
Linguistic error